The Side Show (formerly known as The Fez) is an 1800-capacity Moroccan-themed nightclub situated on Mechau street, Cape Town, South Africa. 

The venue consists of four bars, a Bedouin-covered smoking deck, a VIP balcony stretching the length of the venue, a separate upstairs VIP section, and carousel-style booths with wine-colored cushions that run along the main dance floor.  The seating is also walled in with mirrors. 

The Side Show hosted  Nervo – the DJ twins, Tomorrowland DJ's (Dimitri Vegas and Like Mike, German Superstar Trance Producer Neelix) "The official Playboy Launch", "The Sports Illustrated Official After Parties", the prestigious Global Party brand, and several internationals such as Orca, Hed Kandi and Soul Candi Brands.

References

Buildings and structures in Cape Town
Music of Cape Town
Music venues in South Africa
Nightclubs
Tourist attractions in Cape Town